Culex sitiens is an insect native to coastal areas of East Africa and Madagascar, southwestern Asia, Ryukyu Archipelago, Korea, northern Australia and South Pacific islands.

There is evidence it is a vector for Japanese encephalitis, as well as the roundworm Brugia malayi in Thailand.

References

sitiens
Insect vectors of human pathogens
Insects described in 1828